Duta–Ulu Klang Expressway (DUKE, E33), is the main expressway network in Klang Valley, Malaysia. The  expressway connects New Klang Valley Expressway's Jalan Duta Interchange (E1) to Taman Hillview Interchange on Kuala Lumpur Middle Ring Road 2 28 in Ulu Klang. The expressway was constructed to provide the "missing link" between New Klang Valley Expressway (E1), Kuala Lumpur–Karak Expressway (E8), and Kuala Lumpur Middle Ring Road 2 (JKR28). This expressway is also known as the Kuala Lumpur Northeast Dispersal Link Scheme. It was proposed by Tan Sri Datuk Lim Kang Hoo, a chairman of Ekovest Berhad.

It originally was given route code E16 but later changed to E33 instead.
In addition to improving connectivity, DUKE disperses traffic from the city to the suburban range through several routes in and out of several branches of the main intersection. Through DUKE, drivers can move from one part to other parts of Kuala Lumpur in a short time, by bypassing congested traffic areas, such as Kuala Lumpur Middle Ring Road 1 and Kuala Lumpur Inner Ring Road.

Route background

Duta–Sentul Pasar–Ulu Klang sections
The Kilometre Zero of this section is located at Jalan Duta Interchange near Jalan Duta, Kuala Lumpur, at its interchange with the New Klang Valley Expressway .

Greenwood–Sentul Pasar sections
The Kilometre Zero of this section is located at Sentul Pasar Interchange. At Bandar Dalam Interchange the expressway overlaps with the Federal Route 2 from Bandar Dalam Interchange to Greenwood Interchange.

History
The expressway used to be known as the Kuala Lumpur North East Expressway (KLNEE). It is a main element in the Kuala Lumpur Structure Plan 2020 as specified in the Transportation Research of the Japan International Cooperation Agency (JICA) conducted by the Kuala Lumpur City Hall (Dewan Bandaraya Kuala Lumpur) (DBKL) in 1985. It was identified by DBKL as one of the main connecting routes to complete the Kuala Lumpur Structure Plan 2020. DBKL conducted a detailed study of the alignment that feed the next three years, including Environmental Impact Assessment and Public Opinion. These studies and reports were approved by the Concession Agreement signed with the Federal Government on 12 August 2004.

The construction of this expressway commenced in mid-2006. The Jalan Duta–DUKE Interchange was built at the sharp hairpin of the NKVE and the Jalan Kuching Interchange was built at the former Jalan Kuching Toll Plaza owned by Kamunting Corporation Berhad. The expressway was partially (2/3) opened officially by the Minister of Works Ir Mohd Zin Mohamed on 9 January 2009. Three months later, the NKVE section was open to traffic on 30 April 2009. Built to accommodate 120,000 vehicles per day, this expressway will offer an attractive alternative route to Klang Valley residents, especially for those traveling from east to west and for those who want to go to the city centre.

Progress

Construction progress gallery

Developments

DUKE Extension Expressway Project
The phase two development of the DUKE will be built by Ekovest Bhd and will start in two weeks at a construction cost of RM1.183 billion. Phase two, which will entail the construction of an elevated highway that will complement the existing DUKE, was to be completed in 2015. The DUKE extension will comprise two additional links, namely the Sri Damansara Link and the Tun Razak Link. Both links are proposed to have dual carriageways and the Tun Razak link will be about 9 kilometres in length while the Sri Damansara Link will be 7 kilometres long. The expressway will serve as a link between the Kuala Lumpur Middle Ring Road 1 (MRR1) and Kuala Lumpur Middle Ring Road 2 MRR2.

Features
 Flyovers passing Segambut, Sentul and Setapak town.
 Sentul flyover sections with 132kv of Tenaga Nasional Berhad's (TNB) transmmision line (National Grid). During construction on 2007, the Cabinet directed the concessionaire Konsortium Lebuhraya Utara-Timur (KL) Sdn Bhd to share the TNB reserve in order to reduced land acquisition costs. In order to do this, the existing high tension pylons were replaced with monopoles, with the expressway running either side.

Tolls
The DUKE uses an open toll system.

Batu, Sentul Pasar, Ayer Panas & Segambut toll plazas have fully Electronic Toll Collections (ETC). As part of an initiative to facilitate faster transaction at the Batu, Sentul Pasar, Ayer Panas & Segambut Toll Plazas, all toll transactions at four toll plazas on the DUKE are conducted electronically via Touch 'n Go cards, SmartTAGs or RFID tags starting January 2018.

Toll rates
(Starting 23 November 2017)

Note: Toll charges can only be paid with the Touch 'n Go cards, SmartTAGs or RFID tags. Cash payment is not accepted.

List of interchanges

Phase 1

Duta–Sentul Pasar–Ulu Klang sections (Main Link)

Greenwood–Sentul Pasar sections (Karak Link)

DUKE Extension Expressway

The DUKE Extension Expressway (E33) is an expressway in Kuala Lumpur, Malaysia connecting Sentul Pasar Interchange on the Duta-Ulu Klang Expressway to the Genting Klang–Pahang Highway.

History
The phase two development of the DUKE will be built by Ekovest Bhd and will start in two weeks at a construction cost of RM1.183 billion. Phase two, which will entail the construction of an elevated highway that will complement the existing DUKE, was to be completed in 2015. The DUKE extension will comprise two additional links, namely the Sri Damansara Link and the Tun Razak Link. Both links are proposed to have dual carriageways and the Tun Razak link will be about 9 kilometres in length while the Sri Damansara Link will be 7 kilometres long. The expressway will serve as a link between the Kuala Lumpur Middle Ring Road 1 (MRR1) and Kuala Lumpur Middle Ring Road 2 MRR2. This 9 kilometre and 7 kilometre segment was opened to traffic on 28 September 2017 and 23 October 2017.

Tolls
The DUKE Extension Expressway uses an open toll system.

Sentul Pasar & Segambut toll plazas have fully Electronic Toll Collections (ETC). As part of an initiative to facilitate faster transaction at the Sentul Pasar & Segambut Toll Plazas, all toll transactions at two toll plazas on the DUKE are conducted electronically via Touch 'n Go cards, SmartTAGs or RFID tags starting January 2018.

(Starting 23 November 2017)

Note: Toll charges can only be paid with the Touch 'n Go cards, SmartTAGs or RFID tags. Cash payment is not accepted.

List of interchanges

Phase 2

Sri Damansara Link

Sentul Pasar–Jalan Gombak Link

Tun Razak Link

See also
 Sentul Raya
 Kuala Lumpur

References

External links
 MRCB Group 
 Duta–Ulu Klang Expressway (DUKE) website
 EKOVEST
 DUKE Highway 2 blogspot
 mont'kiara & desa sri hartamas portal

2009 establishments in Malaysia
Expressways in Malaysia
Expressways and highways in the Klang Valley